Francis W. Kennedy House is a historic home located in West Whiteland Township, Chester County, Pennsylvania. It was designed by noted Philadelphia architect Frank Miles Day (1861–1918) and built in 1889.  It is a -story, Shingle Style dwelling.  It features a gambrel roof, projecting bays and dormers, a corner turret, and porches.

It was listed on the National Register of Historic Places in 1984.

References

Houses on the National Register of Historic Places in Pennsylvania
Shingle Style architecture in Pennsylvania
Houses completed in 1889
Houses in Chester County, Pennsylvania
National Register of Historic Places in Chester County, Pennsylvania
1889 establishments in Pennsylvania